Jeroen Dubbeldam (15 April 1973 in Zwolle) is a Dutch show jumping champion. 

Dubbeldam competed at the 2000 Summer Olympics held in Sydney, where he won a gold medal in Individual Jumping on the horse De Sjiem.

He won gold in the individual jumping event at the 2014 World Equestrian Games in Normandy, France  as well as being part of the winning Dutch team in the team jumping event on the horse Zenith FN.

Dubbeldam also won Team and Individual gold at the 2015 Aachen European Show Jumping Championships on the horse Zenith FN.

Dubbeldam qualified for the 2016 Summer Olympics and was the Dutch flag bearer for the Parade of Nations. In Individual Jumping, he placed 7th on the horse Zenith. In the Team Jumping competition, the Dutch team finished in 7th place.

References

External links

 
 
 
 

 
 

1973 births
Living people
Olympic gold medalists for the Netherlands
Equestrians at the 2000 Summer Olympics
Equestrians at the 2016 Summer Olympics
Olympic equestrians of the Netherlands
Dutch male equestrians
Dutch show jumping riders
Sportspeople from Zwolle
Olympic medalists in equestrian
Medalists at the 2000 Summer Olympics